Bulkley John Mackworth Praed (2 August 1799 – 12 March 1876) was an English first-class cricketer who is recorded in one match in 1822, totalling 2 runs with a highest score of 1 not out. He was educated at St John's College, Cambridge.

Mackworth-Praed was married three times:
 On 22 December 1828 to Emma Dick (d. 3 August 1836)
 On 14 July 1840 to Elizabeth Colthurst FitzPatrick (d. 6 February 1852), with whom he fathered Herbert Mackworth-Praed.
 On 26 April 1859 to Emily Maria Fane (d. 11 May 1905)

His brother was the poet Winthrop Mackworth Praed.

References

Bibliography
 

English cricketers
Alumni of St John's College, Cambridge
English cricketers of 1787 to 1825
1799 births
1876 deaths
Marylebone Cricket Club Second 10 with 1 Other cricketers